Ceylonese Rugby & Football Club, also known as CR & FC, is a Division-A rugby union team based in Colombo, Sri Lanka which plays in the Dialog Rugby League. Established in 1922, the club has won the Clifford Cup Knockout Tournament twelve times. Their nickname is the Red Shirts.

History
The club was founded in 1922 by Colonel E. H. Joseph. It was the first rugby-only sporting organisation in the country at the time. It had its roots in the Nondescripts Cricket Club (NCC), and depended on NCC and Havelock Sports Club for practices and matches during its first four years. Supporters called them the Red Shirts because of their uniform and club colours.

Prominent figures in Sri Lankan society participated in the committee at the inaugural Annual General Meeting in 1923, including members of the Schokman, Rockwood, Saravanamutthu, Weinman, and Ondatjie families. The first captain was L. O. Weinman, and the vice-captain was Rajah Hewavitharana.

After World War I, the Clifford Cup was re-introduced and the CR & FC lost to the United Services team 3-6. The club flourished over the next few decades, with boys from Trinity College, Royal College, Zahira College, St Peter's College, St Thomas' College, and subsequently Isipathana College representing it with distinction. A new clubhouse was opened in December 1964, and the main gate was opened in 1965.

The club also maintains a senior Men's Rugby Union team. Features for members include a billiard room, squash courts, lighted tennis courts, a gymnasium, a swimming pool and an indoor badminton court. CR & FC has had a number of its players play for the Sri Lanka national rugby union team.

Colours and name
The club colours are those of the regiment commanded by its founder, E. H. Joseph. He insisted that the club colors should be the artillery red and blue, and persuaded the general committee.

Stadium
The club's home ground is CR & FC Grounds. On 29 June 2007 a new pavilion was opened by its primary sponsors, Football Federation of Sri Lanka president Hurley Silveira and Hong Kong and Shanghai Banking Corporation CEO David Griffiths. The new building includes a 500-seat viewing deck, six corporate boxes, two dressing rooms, an outside bar for members and guests, a bar for members, and a restaurant for members and guests.

Players

Current Players
Kavindu De Costa - Captain
Achitha Radeeshan
Chamod Anjana Fernando
Cheka Jayawardana
Devinda Kumara Rathnayake
Dilshan Madusanka
Don Ashen Induwara
Eranda Harshana
Gemunu Chethiya

Harith Udara Bandara
Hirantha Manamendra
Induwara Bimsara Ranathunga
Jero Dananjaya
Kalindu Nandila
Mursheed Zubair Doray
Madusha Kaveen Sri Vikum
Migara Mihisanka
Milan Avishaka Manthrigama
Navindu Madushan Silva
Pasindu Uthpala Fernanado

Praveen Sagasekara
Rasanga Dinushan
Sachith Pieris
Sameera Piyumal Buljance
Saranga Udawatta
Sarindu Sihasara
Shehan Eranda Kelaniyagoda
Supun Warnakulasuriya
Thisila Devinda Karunatilake
Tuan Dilshan Jayah

Past players
1923-1950 
 L. O. Weinman (1923-1924)
 A. R. Lourensz (1924-1926)
 J. A. V.Modder (1927-1928)
 C. W. M. Oorloff (1929-1930)
 G. Pereira (1930-1931)
 E. F. N. Gratiaen (1932-1933)
 S. G. De Zoysa (1934-1935)
 E. F. N. Gratiaen (1936-1937)
 R. E. Blaze (1937-1938)
 W. D. Ratnavale (1938-1940)
 N. W. Weerasinghe (1940-1942)
 Vacant (1942-1946)
 F. B. Ohlmus (1946-1948)
 F. E. Keller (1948-1949)
 W. Molegoda (1949-1950)
 D L de Z Wickremasinghe  (1938-1952)

1950-1970
 A. Perera (1950-1951)
 M. Rodrigo (1951-1954)
 Summa Navaratnam (1954-1956)
 M. G. Wright (1956-1957)
 G. C. Weinman/A. A. Cader (1957-1958)
 A. A. Cader (1958-1959)
 A. Paiva (1959-1960)
 K. Rambukwella (1960-1961)
 G. C. Weinman (1961-1962)
 G. R. Ingleton (1962-1964)
 R. T. De Sylva (1964-1965)
 S. C. De Sylva (1965-1966)
 E. D. K. Roles (1966-1967)
 M. Azain (1967-1968)
 T. L. Sirimanne (1968-1969)
 M. Sahayam (1969-1970)

1970-1990
 N. H. Omar (1970-1971)
 D. V. P. Samarasekera (1971-1972)
 D. De Almeida (1972-1973)
 K. G. Ratnapala (1973-1974)
 R. Bartholameusz (1974-1975)
 R. W. Schockman (1975-1976)
 I. Coomaraswamy (1976-1977)
 S. H. C. Fernanndo (1977-1978)
 I. M. De Z. Gunasekera (1978-1979)
 P. R. Balasuriya (1979-1980)
 J. Rudra (1980-1981)
 C. P. Abeygunawardena (1981-1982)
 Sheham Siddik (1982-1991)
 I. Musafer (1982-1983)
 L. RSiriwardena (1983-1984)
 E. M. S. Matthysz (1984-1985)
 K. R. T. Peiris (1985-1986)
 E. Epaarachchi (1986-1987)
 D. T. A. Adihetty/C. Jordashe (1987-1988)
 C. Jordashe (1988-1989)

1990-2010
 P. Ekanayake (1990-1991)
 L. V. Ekanayake (1991-1992)
 L. Gunaratne (1992-1994)
 Shanitha Fernando (1994-1995)
 L. Gunaratne (1995-1996)
 V. Prasanna (1996-1997)
 A. Hensman (1997-1998)
 C. Nishantha (1998-2000)
 S. de Saram (2000-2001)
 K. Musafer (2001-2002)
 A. Rodrigo (2002-2003)
 S. Nawaz (2003-2004)
 P. Fernando (2004-2007)
 Zulfikar Haleemdeen (2006-2007)
 A. Dharmatilleke (2007-2008)
 S. Mohamed (2008-2009)
 Ashean Karthelis (2009-2010)
 Dushantha Lewke (2010–2011)
 Lasitha De Costa  (2011-2012)
 Ishan Noor (2013-2014)
 Ashan De Costa(2014-2015)
 Ishan Noor(2015-2016)
 Shane Sammandapperuma(2016-2017)
 Kavindu Perera(2017-2018)
 Omalka Gunaratne(2018-2019)

General committee (2021-2022)

 Mr. Hiran Muttiah – President 
Mr. Savantha De Saram – Deputy President  
Mr. Jakque Diasz – Hony. Gen. Secretary  
Mr. Zulker Hameed – Asst. Hony. Gen. Secretary  
Dr. Ravi Edirisinghe – Hony. Treasurer  
Mr. Nuwan De Silva – Hony. Asst. Treasurer  
Mr. Tikiri Ellepola – Vice President  
Mr. Shanitha Fernando  – Vice President  
Mr. Chandima Perera – Hony. Bar Secretary  
Mr. Hamza Hassanally – Hony. Restaurant Secretary  
Mr. Gyan Amarasinghe – Hony. Ground & Pavilion Secretary  
Mr. Janinda Dunuwille – Hony. Social & Entertainment Secretary  
Mr. Dyan Dunuwille – Hony. Facilities & Infrastructure Secretary  
Mr. Savantha de Saram – Chairman Rugby Board  
Mr. Janoda Thoradeniya – Chairman Sponsorship  
Mr. Mano Jayarajan – Chairman Other Games  
Mr. Sriyan Cooray – Past President

Past presidents include:

1922-1960
 E. H. Joseph (1922-1935)
 H. K. De Kretser (1936-1947)
 H. N. V. C. Kelaart (1948-1952)
 V. C. Kelaart (1953-1954)
 S. G. De Zoysa (1954-1955)
 J. W. Serasinghe (1956-1957)
 W. D. Ratnavale (1957-1958)
 A. P. Koelmeyer (1959-1960)

1960-1970
 N. W. Weerasinghe (1960-1961)
 P. Ramanathan (1961-1962)
 F. B. Ohlmus (1963-1964)
 W. Molegoda (1964-1966)
 A. E. R. McHeyzer (1967-1968)
 S. Navaratnam (1968-1969)
 M. G. Wright (1969-1970)

1970-1980
 G. C. Weinman (1970-1971)
 R. Rajasingham (1971-1972)
 M. Rodrigo (1972-1973)
 K. Rambukwella (1973-1975)
 A. K. Doray (1975-1976)
 D. Rodrigo (1976-1977)
 T. C. M. Muttaih (1977-1978)
 Percy Perera (1978-1979)
 S. Navaratnam (1979-1980)

1980-1990
 Lalith De Silva (1980-1981)
 N. H. Omar (1981-1982)
 D. V. P. Samarasekera (1982-1983)
 D. De Almeida (1983-1984)
 Ifthikar Cader (1984-1985)
 S. H. C. Fernando (1985-1986)
 U.N. Gunasekera (1986-1990)

1991–present
 S. R. P. Samarasekera (1991-1992)
 R. T. De Sylva (1993-1994)
 G. Manik Pereira (1995-1996)
 D. M. Balasuriya (1996-1997)
 C. J. Fernando (1998-1999)
 E. M. S. Matthysz (2000-2002)
 C. Dharmadasa (2003-2004)
 R. N. Balasuriya (2005-2008)
 Jehan CanagaRetna (2009-2010)
 Rienzie Fernando (2011-2012)
 Christopher Jordash (2013-2014)
 Ravi Guneratne

Honours

The club was the 2013 Plate and Shield Champion in the SLRFU Sevens Tournament. In 2007 it was a runner-up in the Caltex League Tournament, and in 2006, 2008, 2009, and 2010 it was a runner-up in the Dialog Rugby League. The club was a runner-up in the 2008 Clifford Cup and the winner in 1954–1959, 1964–1966, 1987–1989 and 2006. It was also the champion of the President's Trophy Knockout Tournament in 1977, 1983, 1990–1994 and 2007.

References

External links
 Ceylonese Rugby & Football Club official website
 CR & FC official Facebook page
 Sri Lanka RFU Official website
 Provincial Unions
 Images of CR & FC

Rugby clubs established in 1922
Sri Lankan rugby union teams
Gentlemen's clubs in Sri Lanka